People Like Us is the fifth and final studio album released by the American folk rock vocal group The Mamas and the Papas. Released in November 1971, (three years after the group originally split) the album came to be because the former members of the group were still under contract with Dunhill Records. The group had originally been signed to the label when it was run by their original producer Lou Adler, but by 1971, Dunhill's distributor, ABC Records, had purchased the label and discovered the clause in the group's original contract. According to their contract, the group had to produce one more album, or else be in breach of contract and subject to possible fines. The album is considered a disappointment by fans and critics. Nevertheless, it sold moderately well (#84 on the Billboard Pop Albums Chart). It was produced by John Phillips. Michelle Phillips later wrote in the liner note of a Mamas & Papas CD compilation that the album "sounded like what it was, four people trying to avoid a lawsuit".

All tracks except "I Wanna Be a Star" (co-written by Michelle) were written by John, making People Like Us The Mamas and the Papas' only entirely self-written and produced album. Some of the lyrics refer to John's romance at the time with actress Geneviève Waïte, whom he married in 1972.

Tracks include "Pearl", a tribute to singer Janis Joplin, the single "Step Out" (#81 Billboard Hot 100, #25 Adult Contemporary) and the title track which is the last song the group ever recorded. Due reportedly to the illness of Cass Elliot during the sessions, most lead vocals are handled by Denny Doherty and Michelle, and while present and audible on certain tracks, Elliot does not feature prominently on the album.

People Like Us was reissued on MCA Records and Geffen Records.

Track listing
All songs written by John Phillips, except where noted.

Side A
"People Like Us" - 3:25
"Pacific Coast Highway" - 3:04
"Snowqueen of Texas" - 2:37 (J.Phillips/G.W.)
"Shooting Star" - 2:54
"Step Out" - 3:03
"Lady Genevieve" - 3:48

Side B
"No Dough" - 3:05
"European Blueboy" - 3:39 (J.Phillips/G.W.)
"Pearl" - 2:24
"I Wanna Be a Star" (Michelle Phillips) - 2:17
"Grasshopper" - 2:57
"Blueberries for Breakfast" - 2:59

Bonus Tracks (Expanded CD Version)
13. "Fantastic Four" [Outtake] 2:33
	
14. "Lady Genevieve" [Outtake] 4:30

15. "No Dough (Honeymoon)" [Alternative mix] 3:07

16. "Mississippi" [Album version] 3:36

17. "April Anne"  3:20

18. "Revolution on Vacation" [Alternative mix] 2:45

19. "Cup of Tea (Sky Jacked)" [Alternative mix] 3:50

20. "Me and My Uncle (Jack of Diamonds)" 4:20

21. "Andy's Talkin' Blues" 2:53

Personnel
Denny Doherty – vocals
Cass Elliot – vocals
John Phillips – vocals, guitar
Michelle Phillips – vocals
Gary Coleman – drums, tambourine, bells, vibraphone, shaker
Ed Greene – drums
Bobbye Hall – conga, tambourine, shaker, cabasa
Jim Horn – flute, saxophone
Clarence McDonald – keyboards
Tony Newton – bass guitar
Earl Palmer – drums
Donald Peake – guitar
Joe Sample – keyboards
Louie Shelton – guitar
David T. Walker – guitar

Technical
Gene Page - orchestral arrangement
Dave Hassinger - engineer
Rick Heenan, Val Garay - assistant engineer
Henry Diltz - cover photography

Chart positions

References

The Mamas and the Papas albums
1971 albums
Albums arranged by Gene Page
Dunhill Records albums